Garfield is an unincorporated community in Union Township, Montgomery County, in the U.S. state of Indiana.

History
A post office was established at Garfield in 1880, and remained in operation until 1907. The community was named after James A. Garfield (1831–1881), 20th President of the United States.

Geography

Education
Residents are zoned to North Montgomery Community School Corporation schools. Elementary students are zoned to Sugar Creek Elementary School. Secondary students attend Northridge Middle School and North Montgomery High School.

References

Unincorporated communities in Montgomery County, Indiana
Unincorporated communities in Indiana